Dendrodoris is a genus of nudibranchs, marine gastropod molluscs in the family Dendrodorididae.

Species
Species so far described in this genus include:

 Dendrodoris albobrunnea Allan, 1933
 Dendrodoris albopurpura Burn, 1957
 Dendrodoris angolensis Valdés & Ortea, 1996
 Dendrodoris arborescens (Collingwood, 1881)
 Dendrodoris areolata (Alder & Hancock, 1864)
 Dendrodoris atromaculata (Alder & Hancock, 1864)
 Dendrodoris aurea (Quoy & Gaimard, 1832)
 Dendrodoris azineae Behrens & Valdes, 2004
 Dendrodris behrensi Millen & Bertsch, 2005
 Dendrodoris brodieae Valdés, 2001
 Dendrodoris caesia (Bergh, 1907)
 Dendrodoris carbunculosa (Kelaart, 1858)
 Dendrodoris citrina (Cheeseman, 1881)
 Dendrodoris coronata Kay & Young, 1969
 Dendrodoris denisoni (Angas, 1864)
 Dendrodoris elizabethina (Kelaart, 1859)
 Dendrodoris elongata Baba, 1936
 Dendrodoris fulva (MacFarland, 1905)
 Dendrodoris fumata (Rüppell & Leuckart, 1830)
 Dendrodoris goani Rao & Kumary, 1973
 Dendrodoris grandiflora (Rapp, 1827)
 Dendrodoris guineana Valdés & Ortea, 1996
 Dendrodoris gunnamatta Allan, 1932
 Dendrodoris guttata (Odhner, 1917)
 Dendrodoris herytra Valdés & Ortea in Valdés, Ortea, Avila & Ballesteros, 1996
 Dendrodoris kranjiensis Lim & Chou, 1970
 Dendrodoris krebsii (Morch, 1863)
 Dendrodoris krusensternii (Gray, 1850)
 Dendrodoris limbata (Cuvier, 1804)
 Dendrodoris magagnai Ortea & Espinosa, 2001
 Dendrodoris maugeana Burn, 1962
 Dendrodoris nigra (Stimpson, 1855)
 Dendrodoris nigromaculata (Cockerell, 1905)
 Dendrodoris nigropunctata (Vayssière, 1912)
 Dendrodoris orbicularis Valdes, 2001
 Dendrodoris rainfordi Allan, 1932
 Dendrodoris rubra (Kelaart)
 Dendrodoris sadoensis Baba, 1993
 Dendrodoris senegalensis Bouchet, 1975
 Dendrodiris stohleri Millen & Bertsch, 2005
 Dendrodoris tuberculosa (Quoy & Gaimard, 1832)
 Dendrodoris warta Ev. Marcus & Er. Marcus, 1976

Taxon inquirendum
 Dendrodoris jousseaumei (Vayssière, 1912)
 Species brought into synonymy
 Dendrodoris australiensis (Abraham, 1877): synonym of Dendrodoris nigra (Stimpson, 1855)
 Dendrodoris clavalata (Alder & Hancock, 1864): synonym of Dendrodoris krusensternii (Gray, 1850)
 Dendrodoris davisi Allan, 1933: synonym of Doriopsilla miniata (Alder & Hancock, 1864)
 Dendrodoris denisoni (Angas, 1864): synonym of Dendrodoris krusensternii (Gray, 1850)
 Dendrodoris gemmacea (Alder & Hancock, 1864): synonym of Dendrodoris denisoni (Angas, 1864): synonym of Dendrodoris krusensternii (Gray, 1850)
 Dendrodoris kalkensis (Barnard, 1927): synonym of Dendrodoris caesia (Bergh, 1907)
 Dendrodoris melaena Allan, 1932: synonym of Dendrodoris nigra (Stimpson, 1855)
 Dendrodoris singaporensis Lim & Chou, 1970: synonym of Dendrodoris atromaculata (Alder & Hancock, 1864)

References

 Gofas, S.; Le Renard, J.; Bouchet, P. (2001). Mollusca, in: Costello, M.J. et al. (Ed.) (2001). European register of marine species: a check-list of the marine species in Europe and a bibliography of guides to their identification. Collection Patrimoines Naturels, 50: pp. 180–213

Dendrodorididae
Taxa named by Christian Gottfried Ehrenberg